The Srivaishnava Urdhva Pundra (Alternatively referred to as Thiruman, Sricharanam, or Namam) is the tilak worn by the adherents of Sri Vaishnavism. The figure drawn is representative of the feet of Narayana with the goddess Lakshmi featured in the middle.

Form

The original tilak
The two Iyengar denominations, the Tenkalai and the Vadakalai, wear the namam with slightly altered designs. The namam for the adherents of the Tenkalai tradition includes a white bow that extends to the bridge of the nose, shaped like a Y. A red line runs down the middle of this design. This particular tilak is believed to have its origin in the Pancharatra text Ishwara Samhita. The adherents of the Vadakalai tradition wear a similar white bow-shaped design shaped like a U, featured entirely upon the forehead. A red or sometimes yellow line runs down the middle of this design. 

Priests serving in temples traditionally wear the Thiruman Srichurnam on 12 spots of their body (dvadasa pundram) according to the Samasrayanam.

The original forms of the naamam are depicted in the gallery below.

The abbreviated form 
The abbreviated namam is more commonly worn by Bhagavathars, Iyengars, as well as all denominations of Sri Vaishnavas, and Pandaris in daily life. It consists of a single thin, vertical red or yellow line worn in the middle of the forehead. This abbreviated namam has become commonplace in religious as well as secular events.

Etymology and meaning
The Parashara Smriti gives a very detailed explanation on the Thiruman: where, when, and how to wear it, as well as what should be chanted while wearing the same.

Srichurnam is the yellow/red line in the middle of the white marks. The white marks are called Thiruman in Tamil. The word Srichurnam is often referred with the Thiruman and is called as Thiruman Srichurnam (or Oordhva Pundram). Particularly for the followers of Sri Sampradayam Srivaishnavas, Sriman Narayana (Vishnu) is always seen as being inseparable from his divine consort, Lakshmi, and hence the marks on 

The etymology of Srichurnam is as follows: Sri refers to Lakshmi, while churanam literally means powder. The Srichurnam - the red/yellow line in the middle - represents Lakshmi. Thiruman (tiru = holy, man = clay) represents the feet Vishnu.

Composition
Apart from the main ingredients described below, several auspicious substances are added, such as Tulasi, rice, turmeric, camphor, flowers.

Thiruman
The white powder in Thiruman is derived from decayed schistose mica.
It is found, among other places, in Melukote.

Shrichurnam
The yellow mark is worn using turmeric.

The red mark is made of turmeric mixed with lime.

Notes

References

See also

Tilak (Vaishnava)
 Vibhuti

Social groups of India
Tamil Brahmins
Sri Vaishnavism
Hindu philosophical concepts